Asia's Next Top Model (abbreviated as AsNTM) is a reality television show based on the American franchise America's Next Top Model in which a number of aspiring models compete for the title of Asia's Next Top Model and a chance to start their career in the modeling industry. The show features models from the entire Far East region (East Asia, South Asia and Southeast Asia).

Search for contestants
An extensive online search takes place for the selection process. Models of Asian descent or nationality are all allowed to apply, but they must be able to speak and write in English. Contestants who have previously participated in another Top Model franchise can still apply for the competition as long as they were not the winner, and are not currently under contractual obligations with an agency or endorsing any product or brand.

Format 

Each cycle of Asia's Next Top Model has about 12-13 regular episodes, with a special recap episode which airs near the end of each cycle. Each cycle generally begins with about 14–16 contestants. Contestants are judged weekly on their overall appearance, participation in challenges, and their best photos from that week's photo shoot.

Each episode, one contestant is eliminated, though in rare cases a double elimination or non-elimination was given by consensus of the judging panel. Makeovers are given to contestants early in the cycle (usually after the first or second elimination) and a trip to an international destination is sometimes scheduled about two-thirds of the way through the cycle.

In contrast the American version, the contestants receive instruction from a mentor who helps coach them in various aspects of the modelling industry and acts as a general assistant during photo shoots and challenges. Past mentors have included Joey Mead King (cycles 1–3), Kelly Tandiono (cycle 4) and Cara G. McIlroy (cycle 5). Beginning with cycle 4, the show adapted the scoring system introduced in the American version. The scores included the judges' scores of photoshoot and the challenge scores.

Judges 
For the sixth cycle, Cindy Bishop and Yu Tsai returned to the panel as the host and creative consultant of the show, respectively. Cara G. McIlroy did not return for the sixth cycle. Instead, she was replaced by Monika Sta. Maria from cycle 3, Shikin Gomez and Minh Tu Nguyen from cycle 5 as model mentors throughout the sixth cycle. However, they did not participate in the judging panel.

Previous judges of the show include photographers Todd Anthony Tyler (cycle 1), Mike Rosenthal (cycles 2–3), creative director Daniel Boey (cycle 1 & 4) and fashion designer Alex Perry (cycle 3), model mentor Joey Mead King (cycles 1–3), Kelly Tandiono (cycle 4), and Cara G. McIlroy (cycle 5), catwalk coach Adam Williams (cycle 2), and head judges/hosts Nadya Hutagalung (cycles 1–2), and Georgina Wilson (cycle 3).

Cycles

Contestants per country

Controversies

Glenn Tan 
Subaru executive Glenn Tan, who was a guest panelist in the fourth episode of cycle 4, sparked backlash on social media after reprimanding South Korean contestant Sang In Kim. Kim, who was told by Tan, "Who the fuck do you think you are to roll your eyes at me? If I'm the client, I am never, ever going to hire you!", was defended by fans of the show on Facebook. Executive producer of Asia's Next Top Model Sam Gollestani told the BBC, "Glenn provides the perspective of a client when choosing a model to front campaigns for products, which is why he was invited to be a guest judge this season. This scene is reflective of what considerations go into making these decisions when working in the fashion and modelling industry."

Mai Ngo 
In May 2016, twelfth-placing contestant Mai Ngo Quynh, from Vietnam, was fined VND22,500,000 (US$1,000) by the Ministry of Culture, Sports and Tourism (MCST), after it was ruled that she had entered Asia's Next Top Model illegally. Vietnam's official rules specify that all people who participate in beauty competitions abroad must obtain secure permission from the MCST and have won at least one national title. Mai had previously competed on the Vietnamese version of Top Model and in Miss Universe Vietnam, but had not won any titles. It was reported that she was summoned to report to the MCST three times but had failed to do so. The MCST had previously banned her from walking in Vietnam International Fashion Week in April. Mai claimed she did not know that the rule applied to non-professional models, and applied for mitigation of penalty.

Viewership

International broadcasts
Asia's Next Top Model was broadcast in all parts of Asia via cable channel Star World (then Fox Life). The first, fifth and sixth cycle of the series were free to watch on the show's official YouTube channel, but the videos are currently set to private viewing. All other local free-to-air channels aired the series on a one-week delayed schedule.

See also
 Cambodia's Next Top Model
 China's Next Top Model
 India's Next Top Model
 Top Model India
 Indonesia's Next Top Model
 Korea's Next Top Model
 The Models
 Philippines' Next Top Model
 Thailand's Next Top Model
 Vietnam's Next Top Model

References

External links
 Official website

 
Singaporean reality television series
English-language television shows
2012 Singaporean television series debuts
Non-American television series based on American television series
Television series by CBS Studios